Jack Wendell Provonsha  (May 30, 1919 – August 11, 2004) was a Seventh-day Adventist Physician and ethicist.

Biography
He was born on May 30, 1919. He was an emeritus professor of Christian ethics and philosophy of religion at Loma Linda University. He was also the founding director of the Center for Christian Bioethics at the university. He died on August 11, 2004.

See also 

 Seventh-day Adventist Church
 Seventh-day Adventist theology
 Seventh-day Adventist eschatology
 History of the Seventh-day Adventist Church
 28 fundamental beliefs
 Questions on Doctrine
 Teachings of Ellen White
 Inspiration of Ellen White
 Prophecy in the Seventh-day Adventist Church
 Investigative judgment
 The Pillars of Adventism
 Second Advent
 Baptism by Immersion
 Conditional Immortality
 Historicism
 Three Angels' Messages
 End times
 Sabbath in Seventh-day Adventism
 Ellen G. White
 Adventist
 Seventh-day Adventist Church Pioneers
 Seventh-day Adventist worship
 Avondale College
 Ellen G. White Estate

References

External links 
 David R. Larson, Roy Branson, Charles Scriven, Spectrum editors, "In Memory of Jack Provonsha". Spectrum online, August 2004
 Articles by Provonsha and about Provonsha as cataloged in the Seventh-day Adventist Periodical Index (SDAPI)

1919 births
2004 deaths
American Seventh-day Adventists
Seventh-day Adventist theologians
American theologians
Loma Linda University faculty
Seventh-day Adventist religious workers